Gifford Guy Zimmerman (August 25, 1900 – November 27, 1968) was a professional football player who played two seasons in the National Football League, with the Akron Pros and the Canton Bulldogs. In 1926, he scored two touchdowns with the Bulldogs. Prior to playing in the NFL, Zimmerman played college football and college basketball at Syracuse University. He played forward for the Syracuse basketball team for two seasons. On the football field, Giff was a 3-time letterman, playing wingback, tailback and kicker for the 1921, 1922, and 1923 Syrcause football seasons. While at Syracuse, he was also on the track team and president of the Syracuse student body.

Notes

1900 births
1968 deaths
Players of American football from Akron, Ohio
Akron Pros players
Canton Bulldogs players
Syracuse Orange men's basketball players
Syracuse Orange football players
American men's basketball players
Forwards (basketball)